Ernest Robinson Ackerman (17 June 1863 – 18 October 1931) was an American Republican Party politician who represented New Jersey's 5th congressional district in the United States House of Representatives from 1919 to 1931.

Early years
Ackerman was born in New York City on 17 June 1863, and moved with his parents to Plainfield, very shortly afterwards. He was educated at public and private schools and graduated from Plainfield High School in 1880. Employed in cement manufacturing, Ackerman was a member of the Plainfield common council in 1891 and 1892.

Political career
Ackerman was as a member of the New Jersey Senate from 1905 to 1911, serving as president in 1911. He was a delegate to the Republican National Conventions at Chicago in 1908 and in 1916 and a member of the board of trustees of Rutgers College, New Brunswick, 1916-1920. He was also a Federal food administrator for Union County, New Jersey during the First World War and a member of the New Jersey Board of Education 1918-1920.

In September 1907, Ackerman and his wife, Nora Weber Ackerman, attended the maiden voyage of the Cunard liner RMS Lusitania from Liverpool to New York.

Ackerman was a member of the New Jersey Geological Survey and associate of the American Society of Civil Engineers. He was elected as a Republican to the Sixty-sixth and to the six succeeding Congresses. He served from March 4, 1919, until his death in Plainfield, New Jersey, on October 18, 1931; he was buried in the family plot in Hillside Cemetery.

Philatelist
Ackerman was a famous philatelist, and had created a number of award-winning exhibits of postal stamps and postal history. He was known for his famous collections of British Guiana and Spain, but he was regarded as an expert in postage stamps and postal history of the United States. His U.S. collection included scarce carrier and local stamps, United States Department stamps, and U.S. essays and proofs. A part of his valuable United States collection was bequeathed to the Smithsonian Institution’s National Postal Museum in Washington, D.C. Ackerman was named to the American Philatelic Society Hall of Fame in 2000.

See also
List of United States Congress members who died in office (1900–49)

References

External links
Ernest Robinson Ackerman at The Political Graveyard

APS Hall of Fame - Ackerman

1863 births
1931 deaths
Politicians from New York City
American people of Dutch descent
Republican Party members of the United States House of Representatives from New Jersey
Presidents of the New Jersey Senate
Republican Party New Jersey state senators
New Jersey city council members
American philatelists
American Philatelic Society
Politicians from Plainfield, New Jersey
Plainfield High School (New Jersey) alumni
Burials at Hillside Cemetery (Scotch Plains, New Jersey)